La Paloma is a village in the Durazno Department of central Uruguay.

Geography

History
Its status was elevated to "Pueblo" (village) on 3 May 1984 by the Act of Ley Nº 15.542.

Population
In 2011, it had a population of 1,443.
 
Source: Instituto Nacional de Estadística de Uruguay

Places of worship
 Parish Church of the Sacred Heart (Roman Catholic)

References

External links
INE map of La Paloma

Populated places in the Durazno Department